In mathematics, the Dickson invariant, named after Leonard Eugene Dickson, may mean:
The Dickson invariant of an element of the orthogonal group in characteristic 2
A modular invariant of a group studied by Dickson